The Honduras national futsal team represents Honduras during international futsal competitions and is controlled by the Federación Nacional Autónoma de Fútbol de Honduras. As of 2016, the team is integrated in its entirety from amateur players or college students.

History
Honduras officially made their debut at the 2004 CONCACAF Futsal Championship against the United States, losing 1–7 on aggregate. Due to lack of interest and negligence from the Honduran Federation, the team has nearly never appeared in subsequent competitions. Their first ever win took place on 28 January 2016, when they defeated Nicaragua 6–2 in the 2016 CONCACAF Futsal Championship qualification in Guatemala City.

Tournament records

Head to head
 As of 10 May 2016

See also
 Honduras national football team
 Honduras national under-23 football team
 Honduras national under-20 football team
 Honduras national under-17 football team
 Honduras women's national football team

References

Honduras
Futsal
Futsal in Honduras